Mecyclothorax oopteroides is a species of ground beetle in the subfamily Psydrinae. It was described by Liebherr & Marris in 2009.

References

oopteroides
Beetles described in 2009